Italian Sommelier Association, 'AIS' (sometimes also as known as ) is an Italian non-profit organization founded in Milan on July 7, 1965, officially recognised and legally acknowledged by the Italian government on April 6, 1973, with formal President of the Republic decree #539 in 1973. Its founding members were Prof. Gianfranco Botti, Jean Valenti, Leonardo Guerra (tax advisor) and Italian sommelier Ernesto Rossi.
Italian Sommelier Association is part and founding member of the Worldwide Sommelier Association (WSA), which is officially recognized across the world, wherever it is present with an affiliate. AIS is one of the oldest and actually the largest sommelier association in the world.

Mission
The aim of the Italian Sommelier Association, as stated in the third article of its charter, is to qualify sommelier’s role and profession, therefore adding value to wine, traditional specialties and gastronomy culture. Its aim is also to promote, even in the legislative branch, the introduction of its didactic approach in hospitality related schools, as well as to endorse the sommelier's professional role, international recognition and esteem.

Activities
AIS features a main central office in Milan and many branches in each region of Italy which supervise all the local delegations which operate in almost any province throughout the country. Each branch features its president and delegates who promote local initiatives. Other than educational activity, Italian Sommelier Association organizes many food & beverage activities such as guided wine tastings, seminars, dinners, visits to vineyards and wineries and even cruises. It is also host and main partner to many official professional wine evaluations, services, consultings and exhibitions like, for example, Vinitaly.

Education
Diplomas & certificates issued by Italian Sommelier Association are officially recognized throughout the world, wherever WSA is present with an affiliate (United States, Canada, Mexico, Chile, Brazil, Peru, Caribbean, Singapore, Japan, South Korea, Slovenia, Russia, Latvia, Czech Republic, Denmark, San Marino, Scandinavia, Belgium, Germany, Italy, France, Switzerland, United Kingdom and Romania).
Italian Sommelier Association exclusively teaches a three-level certified sommelier course which leads to the achievement of an AIS Sommelier Diploma (Silver). A professional sommelier qualification leading to an AIS Professional Sommelier Diploma (Gold) may be issued after candidate's career assessment as it is only intended for sommeliers actually working in a Food & Beverage establishment.

Qualifications overview and curriculum:

 AIS / WSA – Level 1 Course: Wine tasting technique, viticulture, oenology, service technique
 AIS / WSA – Level 2 Course: Complete Italian and international oenography: wine regions and sub-regions, grape varieties, wine styles, appellation systems.
 AIS / WSA – Level 3 Course: Advanced wine-food pairing technique, wine & food categories, service technique
 AIS / WSA – Sommelier Diploma: AIS (Silver) Sommelier Diploma is released upon successful completion of all three levels and a two-days examination session, featuring written tests (two different tests), blind tasting and wine-food pairing assessment tests, didactic dinner, practical / service and final oral tests. Overall passmark is set to 60%.
 AIS / WSA – Professional Sommelier Diploma: AIS Professional (Gold) Sommelier Diploma, which is released by Italian Sommelier Association after candidate's career assessment.
 ALMA / AIS – Master Sommelier Diploma (Since 2009): This is a special course, designed “to put the finishing touches to the Sommelier’s training with specific preparation dedicated to the management and promotion of wine”. It is either formally and informally considered the fourth level of Italian Sommelier Association education program.

See also

 Sommelier
 Master of Wine
 Wine accessory
 Court of Master Sommeliers
 Wine & Spirit Education Trust (WSET)
 Italian wine
 Vinitaly

References

External links

 
 Worldwide Sommelier Association - Official Website
 Vinitaly - Official Website

Sommelier
Wine tasting
Professional titles and certifications
Organizations established in 1965
Food services occupations